Toémiga is a village in the Kombissiri Department of Bazèga Province in central Burkina Faso, West Africa. The village has a population of 614.

References

External links
Satellite map at Maplandia.com

Populated places in the Centre-Sud Region
Bazèga Province